Montesquieu-des-Albères is a commune in the Pyrénées-Orientales department in southern France.

Geography 
Montesquieu-des-Albères is located in the canton of Vallespir-Albères and in the arrondissement of Céret.

Population

Sites of interest 

 Church of Saint-Saturnin
 Church of Saint-Christopher
 Castle, 11th ctry.

See also
Communes of the Pyrénées-Orientales department

References

Communes of Pyrénées-Orientales